Cheang Pou-soi (born 11 July 1972), also known as Soi Cheang or Bob Cheng, is a Hong Kong film director, film producer, actor and former screenwriter.

Filmography
This is a list of films which Cheang has participated, others are noted.

References

External links
 
 

Hong Kong film directors
Hong Kong screenwriters
Hong Kong male actors
Living people
1972 births